Alan Parsons Live is the first live album by Alan Parsons, recorded in May 1994 during his European tour, and released late that year by Arcade Records in Europe. RCA/BMG added three new studio tracks and changed the cover art when releasing the album in the rest of the world in 1995, renaming it The Very Best Live; stylized on the cover with "The Very Best" in a smaller font between Alan Parsons and Live.  Despite the tour promoting Try Anything Once with seven songs from the album in the setlist, the live performances on the album are all songs from his years with The Alan Parsons Project.

Project regulars Ian Bairnson, Andrew Powell, Stuart Elliott and Richard Cottle anchor the band with Parsons, Gary Howard (Freudiana) and ex-Manfred Mann's Earth Band vocalist Chris Thompson (Try Anything Once) providing vocals for the live tracks.

The album is notable for instrumental track "Luciferama" (a blending of "Lucifer" and "Mammagamma" that first appeared on Andrew Powell's 1983 instrumental album The Philharmonia Orchestra Plays The Best of The Alan Parsons Project, was played like this at the Project's Night of the Proms live performance in 1990 and remains in Parsons' live set to this day); "When", another Parsons songwriting contribution by Bairnson, sung by Thompson; "Take the Money and Run", the second songwriting and first lead vocal contribution to a Parsons album by Elliott; and Thompson's first non-demo studio recording of his co-composition "You're The Voice", a song first recorded and released by John Farnham in 1986.

It is also the only Parsons live album that contains a full rendition of "The Raven" with the vocoder part. The track is prefaced by the second part of "A Dream Within a Dream" (uncredited on the album). Later performances opt for seguing "Breakdown" into the second half of "The Raven".

Reception 
Despite rating the album 2.5 stars out of 5 for AllMusic, reviewer Mike DeGagne praised "When" for "being the catchiest of the trio" of the new songs, as well as the "explosiveness" of the live performances, especially on "Prime Time" and "Standing on Higher Ground", "which both sound livelier than the album versions". He further praised the "fresh and crisp" sound throughout, and concluded, "The stellar execution of the songs played live on this album proves that the group - which remained shy of the spotlight - should have toured more frequently."

Mark Jenkins, reviewing the album for The Washington Post prior to a joint Parsons concert with Kansas, had equal criticism of his keyboard-oriented rock as "rather prim and a bit stiff; it betrays little of the spontaneity of live performance," yet praise for its being "less bombastic than much British art-rock" as well as "a cunning balance between mainstream and snob appeal." Jennings concluded that "slick, tame adult-rock may be out of vogue, but "Live" shows that its melodic quotient is undiminished."

Track listing (EU edition) 
All songs written by Alan Parsons and Eric Woolfson.

1.  Sirius - 2:25 
2.  Eye In The Sky - 4:55
3.  Luciferama - 4:56
4.  Old And Wise - 4:49
5.  Psychobabble - 5:22
6.  The Raven - 5:39
7.  Time - 5:08
8.  You're Gonna Get Your Fingers Burned - 4:18
9.  Prime Time - 5:15
10.  Limelight - 4:40
11.  Don't Answer Me - 4:13
12.  Standing On Higher Ground - 5:30

Track listing (US and Canada) 
All songs written by Parsons and Woolfson, except as indicated.

Side 1
1.  Sirius - 2:25
2.  Eye In The Sky - 5:04
3.  Psychobabble - 5:31
4.  The Raven - 5:58
5.  Time - 5:19
6.  Luciferama - 5:04
7.  Old And Wise - 4:52
8.  You're Gonna Get Your Fingers Burned - 4:27

Side 2
9.  Prime Time - 5:28
10.  Limelight - 4:48
11.  Don't Answer Me - 4:28
12.  Standing On Higher Ground - 5:17
13.  When (Bairnson) - 4:15
14.  Take The Money And Run (Elliott, Powell) - 6:18
15.  You're The Voice (Andy Qunta, Chris Thompson, Keith Reid, Maggie Ryder) - 5:06

Personnel 
 Jeremy Meek - Bass, backing vocals (1-12)
 Felix Krish - Bass (13-15)
 Chris Thompson - Vocals (live, 13, 15)
 Gary Howard - Vocals (live)
 Stuart Elliott - Drums; Vocals (14)
 Ian Bairnson - Lead guitar, assistant producer
 Richard Cottle - Keyboards, saxophone
 Andrew Powell - Keyboards
 Alan Parsons - Producer, Mixer, Backing Vocals, Keyboards, Rhythm guitar
 Artwork – Julien Mills
 Tour coordinator – Keith Morris
 Design – Peter Curzon, Storm Thorgerson
 Layout (EU edition) – Myosotis
 Cover (non-EU editions) - Jon Crossland, Peter Curzon, Storm Thorgerson
 Management – Pete Smith, Isis Music
 Mastering – Simon Heyworth
 Photography – Paul Maxon, Storm Thorgerson
 Live Engineering – Bill Irving, Gary Bradshaw
 Recorded Digitally on Tascam DA-88s using Audio Technica Microphones.
 Mastered at Chop'em Out.
 Recorded on tour in Europe in May 1994.
 Live Postproduction at Parsonics, Sussex, October 1994.
 Tracks 13-15 Recorded and mixed at Parsonics, February 1995.

References

Further reading
 
 
 
 
 

Alan Parsons albums
Albums with cover art by Storm Thorgerson
Albums produced by Alan Parsons
Live progressive rock albums
1994 live albums